Padborg station is a railway station in the Danish town of Padborg in the southern part of Jutland. The station is located on the Fredericia–Flensburg railway line and is the last Danish train station before the border with Germany which lies immediately south of the station.

History 
The station opened in 1864 and was located in the Prussian province of Schleswig-Holstein until 1920. It became a border station as a consequence of the 1920 Schleswig plebiscites which determined the current border between Denmark and Germany through the former Duchy of Schleswig.

Pre-Schengen, Padborg was where there was a large-scale checking of travelers passports, visas and / or other identity documents but this has disappeared after 2001 when Denmark became an active part of the Schengen Area. Temporarily since 2015, passports control is reintroduced. During COVID-19 pandemic, fairly much checks of border crossing certificates and vaccination documentation took place, although with more limited number of passengers.

Passenger traffic has especially gained momentum after Eurocity and CityNightLine lines was created and developed. 2019–2028 the Vogelfluglinie is closed for rail traffic, so all trains between Copenhagen and Hamburg goes through Padborg.

Operations 

A three times (more in summer) daily Copenhagen-Hamburg service is operated by DSB and calls here, supplemented by a few services of DSB trains Copenhagen-Flensburg and Aarhus-Hamburg. Padborg has facilities to allow change of locomotives. Both locomotives equipped only for Danish electrical system and those equipped only for German electrical system can go to Padborg. This is much used for freight trains, and for the overnight sleepers Malmö-Berlin and Stockholm-Hamburg which do not allow passengers to board/disembark in Padborg.

Facilities 
The extensive station building has no booking office (self-service ticket machines available) but has a waiting room and toilet facilities. Office space in the station building is used by a number of railfreight companies as Padborg retains extensive railway marshalling yards north of the passenger station.

See also 
 List of railway stations in Denmark
 Rail transport in Denmark
 Denmark–Germany border

References

Citations

Bibliography

External links 

  Banedanmark – government agency responsible for maintenance and traffic control of most of the Danish railway network
  DSB – largest Danish train operating company
  Danske Jernbaner – website with information on railway history in Denmark

Railway stations in the Region of Southern Denmark
Knud Tanggaard Seest railway stations
Railway stations opened in 1864
Railway stations in Denmark opened in the 19th century